James Ross Lightfoot (born September 27, 1938) is an American businessman-broadcaster who served as a member of the United States House of Representatives from Iowa.

Early life
Lightfoot was born in the Florence Crittenton Home for Unwed Mothers in Sioux City, Iowa. He was raised on a farm near Farragut, Iowa, where he graduated from Farragut High School in 1956.

Career

Early career 
Lightfoot served eight years in the United States Army and United States Army Reserve. He began his career working for IBM as a customer engineer and was eventually transferred to Tulsa, Oklahoma. He also worked as an officer in the Tulsa Police Department.

Returning to his native Iowa in the early-1960s, Lightfoot became a broadcaster on KMA radio, the flagship station of May Broadcasting Company. While at KMA, Lightfoot was also well known as a rodeo announcer and sought-after speaker for various organizations’ events.

U.S. House of Representatives 
He was elected to the U.S. House of Representatives in 1984, after five-term incumbent Tom Harkin gave up the seat to make a successful run for the United States Senate. Lightfoot served there for six terms, compiling a mostly conservative voting record. During his last term, he served as chairman of the subcommittee of the United States House Committee on Appropriations which funded the Treasury Department, Postal Service, White House and other federal agencies. Lightfoot also spent eight years on the United States House Transportation Subcommittee on Aviation dealing with transportation issues. He holds commercial pilot and flight instructor ratings, which have allowed him a wide perspective on the aviation industry.

1996 U.S. Senate election 

In 1996, conforming to a promise to only serve twelve years in the House of Representatives, he left his seat to run for the Senate against Harkin. His entry into the race came in March. At a severe financial disadvantage, Lightfoot lost the race, after strong pre-election campaigning on Harkin's behalf by Bill Clinton, who carried Iowa by eight points in the presidential election.

1998 Iowa gubernatorial campaign 

In 1998, at the request of the Republican Party, he ran against then State Senator Tom Vilsack for governor of Iowa. Lightfoot led in polling for most of the campaign, but Harkin's campaigning on Vilsack's behalf enabled Vilsack to win narrowly.

Later career 
In December 1998, Lightfoot became the vice president of Forensic Technology, Inc.

Lightfoot was a senior policy advisor for federal government relations with the Washington, D.C., office of Buchanan Ingersoll & Rooney. He was a non-attorney professional in the firm's Federal Government Relations division.

In 2009, Lightfoot started his own consulting firm, Lightfoot Strategies.

Personal life
Lightfoot and wife Nancy reside in White Oak, Texas. They have four children.

References

External links

|-

|-

|-

|-

1938 births
Living people
American municipal police officers
IBM employees
People from Fremont County, Iowa
People from Gregg County, Texas
Politicians from Tulsa, Oklahoma
Politicians from Sioux City, Iowa
Republican Party members of the United States House of Representatives from Iowa
United States Army soldiers
Commercial aviators
Members of Congress who became lobbyists